Itogon, officially the Municipality of Itogon, , is a 1st class municipality in the province of Benguet, Philippines. According to the 2020 census, it has a population of 61,498 people.

The largest municipality in Benguet by land area, Itogon is a mining town, being the site of the first large-scale mining operations in the country.

Itogon is also the site of Binga Dam. managed and operated by the SN Aboitiz Power - Benguet, Inc.

History

Spanish period
During the Spanish Regime, a native of the historic pueblo of Itogon (or Itokhon), named Codeng, was appointed by the Spanish authorities as capitan of another nearby village, Balingway (currently Itogon Central/Proper). Balingway was later established as a town site and renamed after Codeng'''s native place.

American period
During the American rule, Itogon was established as one of the 19 townships of the province of Benguet, upon the issuance of Act No. 48 by the Philippine Commission on November 22, 1900.

Mining operations started in Itogon in 1903, after Benguet Corporation, the Philippines' first mining firm, was established in the town under the name, Benguet Consolidated Mining Company (BCMC), by Americans Nelson Peterson and Harry Clyde.

On August 13, 1908, Benguet was established as a sub-province of the newly created Mountain Province with the enactment of  Act No. 1876.  As a result, six townships of Benguet were abolished, but Itogon remained a constituent town of Benguet sub-province.

 World War II 
Guerrilla forces in Northern Luzon launch a successful attack on the Itogon Mining District on October 15, 1942, drawing Japanese attention. This results in the Japanese pouring more troops in Luzon Island.

Post-war era
In 1948, plans by the National Power Corporation (NAPOCOR) for a second dam construction along the Agno River in the province of Benguet started, after the Ambuklao Dam construction commenced in Bokod. Bulldozers started clearing the forested area of the Guissit Mountains in 1954 for the Binga Dam. Construction of the dam took 3 years and 9 months, from August 1956 until its formal operations opening in May 1960.

On May 15, 1951, the town was converted into a regular municipality from the former municipal district of the same name, with the enactment of Republic Act No. 616''.

On June 18, 1966, the sub-province of Benguet was separated from the old Mountain Province and was converted into a regular province. Itogon remained to be a component municipality of the newly established province.

Geography

The town is bounded by Baguio and the municipality of Tuba on the west, La Trinidad and Tublay on the north-west, Bokod on the north-east, Kayapa and Santa Fe on the southeast, San Manuel and San Nicolas on the south, and Sison on the south-west.

According to the Philippine Statistics Authority, the municipality has a land area of  constituting  of the  total area of Benguet.

Around 80 percent of the municipality's land area is protected as part of the Lower Agno Watershed Forest Reserve and Upper Agno River Basin Resource Reserve. The Agno River traverses the municipality and is impounded at Binga ( from the Ambuklao Dam in Bokod) forming the Binga Dam.

Barangays
Itogon is politically subdivided into 9 barangays. These barangays are headed by elected officials: Barangay Captain, Barangay Council, whose members are called Barangay Councilors. All are elected every three years.

Climate

Demographics

In the 2020 census, Itogon had a population of 61,498.

Generally inhabited by 60 percent Ibalois, 40 percent Kankanaey, and other ethnicities such as the Ilocano, Itogon was the most populous municipality in the province, with a population of 61,773 in the 1990 census. Its population abruptly declined five years after as illustrated in the census of 1995.

Economy 

Itogon's main source of livelihood is mining. Secondary to mining is agriculture. Major mining companies which operate in the town include Benguet Corporation, Philex Mining Corporation, Atok Big Wedge Mining Company (now called Atok Gold Mining Company) and Itogon Suyoc Mines.

Government
Itogon, belonging to the lone congressional district of the province of Benguet, is governed by a mayor designated as its local chief executive and by a municipal council as its legislative body in accordance with the Local Government Code. The mayor, vice mayor, and the councilors are elected directly by the people through an election which is being held every three years.

Elected officials

Tourism

Known tourist destination areas in Itogon include the Binga Dam in Tinongdan and Balatoc Mines Tours in Balatoc, Virac. Other tourist spots include the open pit mines in Loacan, hot spring in Dalupirip, Mount Ugo in Tinongdan, Level 1300 swimming pools in Poblacion with hot steams and bath and the mummies in Domolpos also in Tinongdan.

Transportation
Highways through Itogon:
 Baguio-Bua-Itogon National Road
 Ambuklao Road
 Benguet-Nueva Vizcaya Road

Education

Public schools
As of 2014, Itogon has 39 public elementary schools and 7 public secondary schools.

Private schools
 Sacred Heart High School of Itogon
 Saint Louis High School of Antamok
 Saint Louis High School of Balatoc
 Saint Louis High School of Philex

Notes

References

External links

 
 [ Philippine Standard Geographic Code]

Municipalities of Benguet
Mining communities in the Philippines
Populated places on the Agno River